Praghosh Das is currently the chairman of ISKCON's Governing Body Commission. He was the commission's chairman in 2005.  Praghosh presently serves as the editor in chief of the Dandavats Vaishnava news agency.

References

1961 births
Living people
Converts to Hinduism
English Hare Krishnas